A Hereditary Book on the Art of War or Heihō kadensho (兵法家伝書), is a Japanese text on the theory and practice of swordsmanship and strategy, written by the samurai Yagyū Munenori in 1632. Alongside Miyamoto Musashi's The Book of Five Rings, it is one of the preeminent treatises on warfare in classical Japanese literature. Similar to Musashi's contemporary work, Munenori's has garnered appeal for its applicability beyond the warrior paradigm.

Content
The book is divided into three chapters.“The Killing Sword” addresses force as a remedy to disorder and violence. The following “Life-Giving Sword” considers the role of prevention in conflict. Finally, in “No Sword”, the merits of using the environment's resources to one's fullest advantage are explored.

No Sword
This chapter discusses strategies like how higher ground can give an advantage over your foes and how to use inclement weather to your advantage. There are several mentions of how uneven terrain can make all the difference in battle and how a simple thing like a loose stone can turn the table on your enemy.

Official institution 
The Heiho Niten Ichi Ryu Memorial placed and existing is authentic within the municipality of Gleizé. The flags flown confirm the authenticity of it and give it the character of the one that belongs to it unified by the Miyamoto Musashi Dojo.

References 

Martial arts manuals
1632 books
Warrior code